Dugan Wellness Center, opened in January, 2009, is located on the campus of Texas A&M University–Corpus Christi in Corpus Christi, Texas.  With , the center is the recreation home for students attending the university.  In addition, the center has been the home of the NCAA Division I Texas A&M–Corpus Christi Islanders women's volleyball team since it opened.  The Islanders men's and women's basketball teams have used the venue as their home court for some games since opening.  Other home games are at the off-campus American Bank Center  The facility was named after Jack and Susie Dugan.  The Dugans donated the lead gift of $1 million toward the building's construction cost $21 million cost in 2007.   The ribbon cutting opening ceremony and first men's basketball game at the facility were held on January 24, 2009.

Facility Features
The facility has two NCAA regulation basketball courts and a  strength and conditioning facility.  It also has two multipurpose rooms for classes and two floors of workout equipment.

Southland Conference Tournaments
The 2013, 2017, and 2021 Southland Conference women's volleyball tournaments were held at the Dugan Wellness Center, with the Islanders winning the 2021 tournament.

See also
American Bank Center

References

External links
 Official site

 

College volleyball venues in the United States
Indoor arenas in Texas
Sports venues in Corpus Christi, Texas
Volleyball venues in Texas
Sports venues completed in 2009
2009 establishments in Texas